Don Dada may refer to:

People
Bernard Dong Bortey, "Don Dada"
Louie Rankin, the "Original Don Dada"
YoungBoy Never Broke Again, “Don DaDa”

Music
Don Dada, 1992 album by Super Cat
Don Dada Mixtape Vol. 1, 2021 mixtape by Alpha Wann
"Don Dada", 2010 song by Das Racist from Shut Up, Dude
"Don Dada", 2016 single by K.O (rapper)
"Don Dada", 2020 single by Cakes da Killa